Henri-Julien Dumont (1859 - 1921) was a French impressionist painter, born in Beauvais, Oise. His works were exhibited at the Salon and the Société des Artistes Indépendants. Henri-Julien Dumont's paintings were rewarded in 1900 with a bronze medal at the Universal exhibition.

Works

Notes

External links

 ArtFactHenri-Julien Dumont

1859 births
1921 deaths
People from Beauvais
19th-century French painters
French male painters
20th-century French painters
20th-century French male artists
French Impressionist painters
19th-century French male artists